The Carnage Crew was a professional wrestling stable in Ring of Honor.

History
The Carnage Crew of Loc and DeVito had their first ROH match together at Night of Appreciation defeating The Ring Crew Express. They were very hard-hitting and used many high impact moves. At the time, there were two other similar teams in ROH: Da Hit Squad and the Natural Born Sinners. At Crowning a Champion, The Carnage Crew had a brutal Bunkhouse Match against the Sinners. The match featured chairs, barbed wire, and hubcaps. Even though The Carnage Crew lost, both teams continued fighting after the match was over. At Honor Invades Boston, The Carnage Crew fought another hardcore match, this time losing to Da Hit Squad. With losses to both teams, The Carnage Crew needed to make an impact. At Unscripted, a match was scheduled between Da Hit Squad and the Natural Born Sinners. Before the match started, the Carnage Crew came to the ring and attacked both teams. At the next show, Glory By Honor, they defeated Da Hit Squad in a Falls Count Anywhere match. By the end of 2002, Masada has joined the group. The show Night of The Butcher saw The Carnage Crew in the main event against Homicide and Abdullah the Butcher in a Bunkhouse Match. They lost this match, but proved they could fight with the best.

Wrestlerave 2003 saw another new member when Justin Credible was added to the group. That night, the team of Credible, Loc, and Devito went on to defeat Special K. The Carnage Crew began facing Special K in a series of matches, but were often on the losing end. They even challenged Special K for the ROH Tag Team Championship, but did not win. Finally, at At Our Best, The Carnage Crew defeated Special K in a Scramble Cage in the main event.

In May, Masada would turn on the group to form The New & Improved Carnage Crew with Danny Daniels, taking DeVito out in the process. Justin Credible left the promotion and there-by left the group later on. The New & Improved Carnage Crew started to run through the roster with a convincing win over the Ring Crew. DeVito returned in July to avenge his injury and drive the New Carnage Crew out of RoH. They succeeded and due to the rules of the match, the New & Improved Carnage Crew was gone from RoH. After this, the original Carnage Crew went into a feud with Dan Maff and B. J. Whitmer. Allison Danger wanted Loc and DeVito to destroy Maff and Whitmer for leaving the Prophecy but they wanted to beat them because they can. The feud came to a head at Final Battle 2004 with Maff and Whitmer getting the win and the respect of the Carnage Crew.

Third Anniversary Celebration Part 1 was a terrible day for The Carnage Crew. They were again in the main event Scramble Cage match, but they were defeated by The Ring Crew Express. Because Loc was the one pinned (there were other teams in the match), The Carnage Crew had to stay away from ROH for 90 days. This was terrible for them because wrestling in ROH was the way they provided for their annoying families. When it came time for them to return, The Carnage Crew set their sights on The Ring Crew Express, and defeated them in a Street Fight at The Future is Now and an Anything Goes match at the next show.

July 9, 2005 was the night The Carnage Crew's hard work paid off. At Escape From New York, they defeated B. J. Whitmer and Jimmy Jacobs for the ROH Tag Team Championship. They retained the title in an Ultimate Endurance match, but lost it to Whitmer and Jacobs at the following show. After losing the title, they ended their feud with The Ring Crew Express in a Weapons Match at Night of the Grudges II. After the show, as The Ring Crew Express were taking down the ring, Loc came up to them (DeVito was taken to the hospital) and shook their hands. This was the last time The Carnage Crew appeared in Ring of Honor.

Championships and accomplishments
Ring of Honor
ROH Tag Team Championship (1 time) – DeVito and H. C. Loc

References

External links

Independent promotions teams and stables
Ring of Honor teams and stables